Necip is a Turkish given name for males. People named Necip include:

Necip Fazıl Kısakürek (1904–1983), Turkish poet, novelist, playwright and philosopher
Necip Hablemitoğlu (1954–2002), Turkish historian and Kemalist intellectual
Necip Uysal (born 1991), Turkish footballer

See also 
Najib, Arabic version

Turkish masculine given names